Northern Popoloca is an indigenous language of Puebla state, Mexico. The dialects of the two towns where it is spoken, San Luís Temalacayuca (a.k.a. Temalacayuca, San Luís) and San Marcos Tlacoyalco (a.k.a. Tlacoyalco, San Marcos), are over 90% mutually intelligible.

Phonology

Vowels

Consonants

References

Popolocan languages